Protogautieria is a genus of fungi in the family Gomphaceae. The genus contains two species found in North America.

References

External links

Gomphaceae
Agaricomycetes genera
Taxa named by Alexander H. Smith